Stephen Arthur Frears (born 20 June 1941) is an English director and producer of film and television often depicting real life stories as well as projects that explore social class through sharply drawn characters. He has received numerous accolades including three BAFTA Awards, and a Primetime Emmy Award as well as nominations for two Academy Awards. In 2008, The Daily Telegraph named Frears among the 100 most influential people in British culture. In 2009, he received the Commandeur de l'Ordre des Arts et des Lettres.

Born in Leicester and educated at Gresham's School and Trinity College, Cambridge, Frears started his career working as an assistant director in theatre and film while directing many television plays. Frears directed his debut feature film Gumshoe in 1971, and received widespread critical acclaim for his films in the 1980s such as My Beautiful Laundrette, Prick Up Your Ears, and Dangerous Liaisons. He also received two Academy Award nominations for directing The Grifters and The Queen.

Frears is also known for his work on various television programs, including the television films Fail Safe, The Deal, and Muhammad Ali's Greatest Fight. He directed the Jeremy Thorpe BBC One biographical miniseries A Very English Scandal, for which he earned a Primetime Emmy Award nomination.

Early life and education 
Frears was born on 20 June 1941 in Leicester, England. His mother, Ruth M. (née Danziger), was a social worker, and his father, Russell E. Frears, was a general practitioner and accountant. Frears was brought up Anglican, and did not find out that his mother was Jewish until he was in his late 20s.

From 1954 to 1959, Frears was educated at Gresham's School, an independent boarding school for boys (now co-educational) in the market town of Holt in Norfolk. This was followed by Trinity College, Cambridge, where he earned a BA Law.

Career

Early career 
At the University of Cambridge, Frears was assistant stage manager for the 1963 footlights Revue, which starred Tim Brooke-Taylor, John Cleese, Bill Oddie and David Hatch. After graduating from the university, Frears worked as an assistant director on the films Morgan – A Suitable Case for Treatment (1966) and if.... (1968). His first work as a director in his own right was "The Burning", a 31-minute adaptation of a short story by Roland Starke. Although set in South Africa, it was filmed in Tangier. It found theatrical release attached to Francois Truffaut’s The Bride Wore Black.

Frears spent most of his early directing career in television, mainly for the BBC but also for the commercial sector.  He contributed to several anthology series, such as the BBC's Play for Today. He also produced a series of Alan Bennett's plays for LWT, including The Old Crowd (1979, director:Lindsay Anderson).

1980s 

In the late 1980s, Frears came to international attention as a director of feature films. His directorial film debut was the noir detective spoof Gumshoe (1971). In 1985, Frears found widespread acclaim with My Beautiful Laundrette. The film focuses on an interracial gay romance, based on a Hanif Kureishi screenplay and shot on 16 mm film, was released theatrically to great critical acclaim. It received an Academy Award nomination and two nominations for BAFTA Award. The success of the film helped launch the careers of both Frears and actor Daniel Day-Lewis. 

Frears worked with Adrian Edmondson on Mr Jolly Lives Next Door, a 45-minute programme starring Peter Cook in The Comic Strip Presents television comedy series that aired on Channel Four in 1988. In 1985, Frears had also directed a Comic Strip parody of Daphne Du Maurier's novel Rebecca. Frears next directed the Joe Orton biopic Prick Up Your Ears (1987), a collaboration with playwright Alan Bennett. His second film adapted from a Kureishi screenplay was Sammy and Rosie Get Laid (1987).

In 1988, Frears directed Dangerous Liaisons to widespread critical acclaim. The film was shot in France, with a cast that included Americans Glenn Close, John Malkovich, and Michelle Pfeiffer, and Uma Thurman. Based on the late 18th-century French novel of romantic game playing and adapted by Christopher Hampton. The film received seven Academy Award nominations including Best Picture and Best Actress for Glenn Close and Best Supporting Actress for Michelle Pfeiffer. The film also received 10 British Academy Film Award nominations including for Frears for Best Direction.

1990s 
In 1990, Frears directed the neo-noir crime thriller The Grifters starring John Cusack, Anjelica Huston, and Anette Bening. Martin Scorsese served as a producer on the film. The film won the Independent Spirit Award for Best Film and was declared one of the Top 10 films of 1990 by The National Board of Review of Motion Pictures. Frears was also nominated for the British Academy Film Award for Best Direction and earned him his first Academy Award nomination for best direction. 

In 1992, Frears directed the comedy drama Hero released in the United Kingdom as Accidental Hero. The film starred Dustin Hoffman, Geena Davis, Andy Garcia, and Joan Cusack. Many critics compared the film to those of Preston Sturges and Frank Capra including Roger Ebert who wrote, "It [the film] has all the ingredients for a terrific entertainment, but it lingers over the kinds of details that belong in a different kind of movie. It comes out of the tradition of those rat-a-tat Preston Sturges comedies of the 1940s." While the film was met with generally positive critical reviews, it was not a box office success. Columbia Pictures lost $25.6 million.

Frears has also directed two films adapted from novels by Roddy Doyle, The Snapper (1993) and The Van (1996). Frears' other films include the horror film Mary Reilly and the Western The Hi-Lo Country (1998).

2000s 
In 2000, Frears directed High Fidelity starring John Cusack, Jack Black, Lisa Bonet, and Joan Cusack. The film is based on the 1995 British novel of the same name by Nick Hornby, with the setting moved from London to Chicago and the name of the lead character changed. After seeing the film, Hornby expressed his happiness with Cusack's performance, saying that "at times, it appears to be a film in which John Cusack reads my book." The film received positive reviews from critics and has a "Certified Fresh" score of 91% on Rotten Tomatoes, based on 165 reviews, with an average rating of 7.7/10. The critical consensus states: "The deft hand of director Stephen Frears and strong performances by the ensemble cast combine to tell an entertaining story with a rock-solid soundtrack."

In 2002, Frears directed social thriller, Dirty Pretty Things, a film about two immigrants living in London. The film starred Audrey Tautou, and Chiwetel Ejiofor. The film received widespread critical acclaim, and was nominated for an Academy Award for Best Original Screenplay and won a British Independent Film Award for Best Independent British Film in 2003. For his performance as Okwe, Chiwetel Ejiofor won the 2003 British Independent Film Award for Best Actor. 

In 2003, Frears was attached to direct the James Bond spin-off Jinx, featuring Halle Berry as her character from Die Another Day (2002) co-starring with Michael Madsen and Javier Bardem. Neal Purvis and Robert Wade were scheduled to return to write the screenplay, and Wade described it as "a very atmospheric, Euro thriller, a Bourne-type movie." Producer Barbara Broccoli described it as the beginning of a "Winter Olympics"-style alternative to the conventional Bond films. However, the project was cancelled due to "creative differences" between Eon Productions and MGM and in order to focus on the reboot of the series with Casino Royale (2006).  

In 2003, Frears returned to directing for television with The Deal (2003), which depicts an alleged deal between Tony Blair and Gordon Brown over which of them should become leader of the Labour Party in 1994. Michael Sheen portrayed Tony Blair to great acclaim. In 2005, Frears directed the British theatre comedy Mrs Henderson Presents starring Judi Dench, Bob Hoskins. The film was praised for its performances by Dench and Hoskins with Dench receiving an Academy Award nomination for Best Actress. 

Frears next film project was The Queen (2006), a film that depicts the death of Princess Diana on 31 August 1997 and its reaction from the Monarchy, and the public. The film premiered at the Venice Film Festival where Mirren won Best Actress and Peter Morgan won Best Screenplay. Frears was nominated for the Golden Lion. When released nationally within the United States, the film achieved immense critical acclaim, box-office success, and awards. At the Academy Awards, Frears himself received his second Academy Award nomination for best direction, and actor Helen Mirren won numerous awards for playing the title role including the Academy Award for Best Actress.

2010s 

Frears holds the "David Lean Chair in Fiction Direction" at the National Film and Television School in Beaconsfield, where he teaches. 

In 2013, Frears directed the drama, Philomena (2013), which was based on the 2009 book The Lost Child of Philomena Lee by journalist Martin Sixsmith based on the true story of Philomena Lee's 50-year search for her forcibly adopted son and Sixsmith's efforts to help her find him. The film starred Judi Dench and Steve Coogan. The film premiered at the 70th Venice International Film Festival to great acclaim and writers Jeff Pope and Steve Coogan won the best screenplay award for the film. The film won the People's Choice Award Runner-Up prize at the 2013 Toronto International Film Festival. The film was nominated for four Oscars at the 86th Academy Awards: Best Picture, Best Adapted Screenplay, Best Actress (for Dench), and Best Original Score. It was also nominated for four British Academy Film Awards and three Golden Globe Awards. The same year, HBO released his television drama Muhammad Ali's Greatest Fight, starring Christopher Plummer and Frank Langella, which depicts the United States Supreme Court deliberation over banning Muhammad Ali from boxing for refusing to serve in the US Army during the Vietnam War. 

His biopic of disgraced cycling champion Lance Armstrong, The Program, starring Ben Foster, was premiered in the 2015 Toronto International Film Festival. Many of Frears' films are based on stories of living persons, but he has never sought to meet any of his subjects. National Life Stories conducted an oral history interview (C1316/07) with Stephen Frears in 2008 for its The Legacy of the English Stage Company collection held by the British Library.

In 2016, Frears directed the film, Florence Foster Jenkins, starring Meryl Streep, as the title character, a New York heiress known and aspiring opera singer despite her poor singing abilities. Hugh Grant plays her manager and long-time companion, St. Clair Bayfield. Other cast members include Simon Helberg, Rebecca Ferguson, and Nina Arianda. The film was a critical and commercial success with many praising Streep and Grant for their performances. At the 89th Academy Awards, it was nominated for Best Costume Design and earned Streep her 20th nomination for Best Actress. It received four Golden Globe nominations, including Best Picture in a Comedy or Musical. In 2017, Frears reunited with Judi Dench, this time in Victoria & Abdul, about the real-life relationship between Queen Victoria of the United Kingdom and her Indian Muslim servant Abdul Karim. The film also stars Ali Fazal, Michael Gambon, Eddie Izzard, Tim Pigott-Smith (in his final film role), and Adeel Akhtar. The film had its world premiere at the 74th Venice Film Festival, and was theatrically released on 15 September 2017 in the United Kingdom. It has grossed over $65 million worldwide. 

In 2018, Frears returned to the limited series with A Very English Scandal which premiered on BBC One and later on Amazon Prime. The project is a three-part 2018 British television comedy-drama miniseries based on John Preston's 2016 book of the same name. It is a dramatisation of the 1976–1979 Jeremy Thorpe scandal and more than 15 years of events leading up to it. The series stars Hugh Grant as Jeremy Thorpe, and Ben Whishaw as Norman Scott. The limited series gained great acclaim in both the United Kingdom and the United States. On Rotten Tomatoes, the series holds an approval rating of 97% based on 64 reviews, with an average rating of 9.05/10. Rotten Tomatoes's critical consensus reads, "Hugh Grant and Ben Whishaw impress in A Very English Scandal, an equally absorbing and appalling look at British politics and society". Grant received Primetime Emmy Award, Screen Actors Guild Award, Golden Globe Award, British Academy Television Award, and Critics Choice Award nominations for his performance while Whishaw earned a Emmy, and BAFTA win.

Personal life
In 1968, Frears married Mary-Kay Wilmers, with whom he had two sons, Sam and Will Frears (a stage and film director). Frears left Wilmers while she was pregnant with their second son Will. They lived on Gloucester Crescent in Camden Town. The couple divorced in the early 1970s. Nina Stibbe, the live-in nanny that Wilmers hired in the early 1980s, wrote letters home that described the North London literati life; these were compiled, published, and adapted into the 2016 TV series Love, Nina.

Early in his career, Frears made a programme featuring the band the Scaffold, and he is name-checked ("Mr Frears had sticky-out ears...") in their hit song "Lily the Pink".

 Frears lived in London with Anne Rothenstein and their two children.

Political views
A convinced republican, in April 2015, Frears was one of several celebrities who endorsed the parliamentary candidacy of the Green Party's Caroline Lucas at the 2015 general election.

In December 2019, along with 42 other leading cultural figures, Frears signed a letter endorsing the Labour Party under Jeremy Corbyn's leadership in the 2019 general election.

Filmography

Film

Television

Awards and honours

Over his career, Frears has amassed numerous awards and nominations, including two Academy Award nominations, four Primetime Emmy Award nominations (one win), a Golden Globe Award nomination, and 17 British Academy of Film and Television Arts Award nominations (three wins).

In 1990, Frears earned his first Academy Award nomination for directing the film The Grifters. In 2006, he earned his second nomination for The Queen. At the Primetime Emmy Awards, he was nominated for Fail Safe (2000), Muhammad Ali's Greatest Fight (2013), and A Very English Scandal (2019), before winning for State of the Union (2019). He has also been acknowledged by the Cannes, Berlin, Venice, and Toronto film festivals.

Honors include:
2006: Golden Eye Award for Lifetime Achievement at Zurich Film Festival
2009: Commandeur de l'Ordre des Arts et des Lettres 
2014: Golden Duke for Lifetime Achievement of the 5th Odessa International Film Festival
Honorary Associate of London Film School

References

External links

 Stephen Frears discusses whether his biopics are fact or fiction in The Art Of Life

1941 births
Living people
Alumni of Trinity College, Cambridge
BAFTA winners (people)
Commandeurs of the Ordre des Arts et des Lettres
English film directors
English people of Jewish descent
English republicans
English television directors
People educated at Gresham's School
People from Leicester
Primetime Emmy Award winners
Silver Bear for Best Director recipients